Euscyrtodes is a genus of crickets in the subfamily Euscyrtinae.  Species can be found in Asia, with records from Taiwan, Vietnam and Java.

Species 
Euscyrtodes includes the following species:
Euscyrtodes crassiceps Saussure, 1878
Euscyrtodes ogatai Shiraki, 1930
Euscyrtodes orientalis Gorochov, 1987 - type species (locality: Cuc Phuong, Vietnam)
Euscyrtodes pliginskii Gorochov, 1987
Euscyrtodes vietnamensis Gorochov, 1988

References

External links
 

Ensifera genera
crickets
Orthoptera of Asia
Orthoptera of Indo-China